Cosiri Rodríguez Andino de Dionicio (born August 30, 1977, in San Cristóbal) is a retired volleyball player from the Dominican Republic, who competed for her native country at the 2004 Summer Olympics in Athens, Greece, wearing the number #15 jersey. There she ended up in eleventh place with the Dominican Republic women's national team.

Career
She started representing her home country in the 1993 Central American and Caribbean Games in Ponce, Puerto Rico.

At the 2000 USA Open Championships her team won the championship and she was selected All-Tournament "MVP".

Playing with the Spanish club Hotel Cantur Costa Mogán, Rodriguez won the 2003 Spanish Superleague Championship and the second place at the 2003 CEV Cup.

Rodríguez claimed the gold medal with the national squad at the 2003 Pan American Games. She also was elected Best Digger and Best Receiver. Later that year, she claimed with her team the bronze medal and the Best Receiver award at the 2003 NORCECA Championship.

Cosiri won the "Most Valuable Player" award at the 2004 Distrito Nacional Superior Tournament in Dominican Republic. She helped Mirador to win the 9th consecutive and 23rd Championship, defeating Los Cachorros in the 7th game of the final series.

Late 2004, Rodríguez joined the Spanish club Tenerife Marichal, winning with this team the Spanish Superliga championship and the Queens cup.

Rodríguez played more than 300 matches for her National Team.

For the 2010–2011 season of the Spanish Superliga, Rodríguez signed with Cantabria Infinita, after some of their players decided not to return after the holiday season.

Clubs
  San Cristóbal (1992)
  Mirador (1993–1999)
  Conquistadoras de Guaynabo (1997)
  Los Prados (1999–2002)
  CD Universidad de Granada (2000–2001)
  Construcciones Damesa de Burgos (2001–2002)
  Hotel Cantur Costa Mogán (2002–2003)
  Mirador (2002–2004)
  Kab Holding Sassuolo (2003–2004)
  Tenerife Marichal (2004–2005)
  Los Cachorros (2005)
  Hotel Cantur Las Palmas (2005–2006)
  Voley Sanse Mepaban (2006–2007)
  Mets de Guaynabo (2008)
  San Cristóbal (2008)
  Criollas de Caguas (2009)
  Cantabria Infinita (2010–2011)
  Voley Playa Madrid (2011–2012)

Awards

Individuals
 1997 Puerto Rican League "Best Scorer"
 2000 USA Open Championships "MVP"
 2003 Pan-American Games "Best Receiver"
 2003 Pan-American Games "Best Defender"
 2003 NORCECA Championship "Best Receiver"
 2004 Pan-American Cup "Best Receiver"
 2008 Dominican Volleyball League "Best Server"

Clubs
 2001 Spanish Superliga –  Runner-Up, with CD Universidad de Granada
 2002 Spanish Queen Cup –  Runner-Up, with Construcciones Damesa de Burgos
 2003 CEV Cup –  Runner-Up, with Hotel Cantur Costa Mogán
 2003 Spanish Superliga –  Champion, Hotel Cantur Costa Mogán
 2004 Dominican Republic Distrito Nacional Superior Tournament –  Champion, with Mirador
 2004 Spanish Super Cup –  Champion, with Tenerife Marichal
 2005 Spanish Superliga –  Champion, with Tenerife Marichal
 2005 Spanish Super Cup –  Runner-Up, with Hotel Cantur
 2005 Spanish Queen Cup –  Champion, with Tenerife Marichal
 2005 Dominican Republic Distrito Nacional Superior Tournament –  Runner-Up, with Los Cachorros
 2006 Spanish Superliga –  Runner-Up, with Hotel Cantur
 2006 Spanish Queen Cup –  Runner-Up, with Hotel Cantur
 2008 Dominican Republic Volleyball League –  Runner-Up, with San Cristóbal

References

External links
 FIVB biography
 CEV profile
 CV Diegos Porcelos
 Italian League profile
 Dominican newspaper interview

1977 births
Living people
Dominican Republic women's volleyball players
Volleyball players at the 2004 Summer Olympics
Olympic volleyball players of the Dominican Republic
Volleyball players at the 2003 Pan American Games
Volleyball players at the 2007 Pan American Games
Pan American Games gold medalists for the Dominican Republic
Pan American Games medalists in volleyball
Central American and Caribbean Games gold medalists for the Dominican Republic
Central American and Caribbean Games silver medalists for the Dominican Republic
Competitors at the 1998 Central American and Caribbean Games
Competitors at the 2006 Central American and Caribbean Games
Opposite hitters
Expatriate volleyball players in the United States
Expatriate volleyball players in Spain
Expatriate volleyball players in Italy
Dominican Republic expatriate sportspeople in Italy
Dominican Republic expatriate sportspeople in the United States
Dominican Republic expatriate sportspeople in Spain
Central American and Caribbean Games medalists in volleyball
Medalists at the 2003 Pan American Games